A corporated law firm() is a type of law firm in South Korea. Most South Korean law firms are corporated law firms.

References 

 
Law of South Korea